In post-classical Arabic, a ṭarsh (طرش) is an engraved block used for printing. They were made of wood or tin and were in use from the ninth or tenth century until at least the fourteenth. There are over a hundred known Arabic blockprints on paper, parchment and possibly papyrus. They are mostly small strips intended for use in amulets. They have mainly been identified in public and private collections, but a few prints have been recovered archaeologically at Fusṭāṭ in Egypt. No ṭarsh itself has yet been found.

The origin of ṭarsh, whether borrowed along with paper from China or invented independently in the Islamic world, is disputed. Richard Bulliet, contrasting the rapid adoption of paper and the marginalization of printing in the Islamic world, suggests a separate origin for each and thus the indigenous development of ṭarsh. The origin of the word ṭarsh is uncertain. The Semitic root ṭ-r-š (طرش) is related to deafness and ṭ-r-s (طرس) to writing (including the word for palimpsest), but an Egyptian origin has also been mooted.

The amulet texts printed from ṭarsh contain texts from the Qurʾān and lists of the names of God. They were rolled up and placed in metal cylinders that were worn around the neck. There are examples of calligraphy and at least one example of a Qurʾānic print that looks like it could have been a page from a book. Texts were often printed from more than one block. The longest known text is 107 lines, printed from two blocks on a strip of paper .

Medieval Arabic block printing had been completely forgotten by the time Joseph Karabacek identified some prints in 1894. To date, only two medieval references to printing are known from the Islamic world, both in passages about the Banū Sāsān, the informal guild of beggars, thieves and confidence men. According to Abū Dulaf al-Khazrajī, writing in Persia in the tenth century:
The engraver of ṭarsh is he who engraves moulds for amulets. People who are illiterate and cannot write buy them from him. The seller keeps back the design which is on it so that he exhausts his supply of amulets on the common people and makes them believe that he wrote them. The mould is called the ṭarsh.
There is physical evidence in some prints that ṭarsh were at times made by pouring molten tin in clay moulds. According to Ṣafī al-Dīn al-Ḥillī, an Iraqi poet of the fourteenth century: "And in making moulds [ṭarsh] from tin for turning out amulets and charms, how often has my hand written on the mould in the script of Syriac and then that of phylactery-writing!" That ṭarsh were sometimes carved or cast in Syriac and Hebrew ("phylactery-writing") is evidence that the prints were intended to impress illiterate people with their magical power rather than to be read. One printed Hebrew amulet is known, now at the University of Strasbourg. An Arabic amulet with a border in Syriac, Hebrew, Coptic and Arabic is housed at the University of Utah. The Coptic writing is just transliterated Arabic. The amulet A.Ch. 12.145 now in the Austrian National Library is a fragment of a print made from the same ṭarsh as the Utah amulet. The use of Coptic may indicate that Egyptian Christians were among the buyers of prints.

Notes

Bibliography

External links
Amulet scroll (tarsh) with polychrome block print from The David Collection

History of printing
Relief printing
Medieval Arabic literature